Ngercheu, or Carp Island, is an island located within the nation of Palau, specifically within the state of Peleliu. 

Ngercheu is located 5 km northwest of the main island of Peleliu. Ngercheu is roughly 1 km2, star-shaped, and densely forested. The Carp Island Resort is located on the island and caters to an Asian tourist base.

References

Islands of Palau